Lindigepalpus is a genus of parasitic flies in the family Tachinidae. There are at least two described species in Lindigepalpus.

Species
These two species belong to the genus Lindigepalpus:
 Lindigepalpus bogotensis Reinhard, 1975
 Lindigepalpus townsendi Guimaraes, 1971

References

Further reading

 
 
 
 

Tachinidae
Articles created by Qbugbot